Josef Bolf (born October 7, 1971 in Prague) is a Czech painter. He studied at the Academy between 1990–1998. In 1995 he studied at Kongsthögskolan (Stockholm) and in 1996 at the Akademie der Bildenden Künste in Stuttgart. From 1996 to 2002 he was a member of the art group Bezhlavý jezdec.

Bolf's creation captures the strange characters, often suffering, sometimes half-animal. His paintings are often considered depressed, gloomy, sad, melancholy. His ideas often stem from childhood spent in the southern city of Prague.

Scholarships and residences 

 2007 ISCP (International Studio and Curatorial Program), New York, USA
 2006 Europäische Künstlerhaus, Freising, Germany
 1996 Akademie der Bildende Künst, Stuttgart, Germany
 1995 Kongsthögskolan, Stockholm, Sweden

Awards 

 2011 Umělec roku

Representations in collections 

 8smička, Humpolec, Czech Republic
 AMC Collezione Coppola, Vicenza, Italy
 Collett Prague/Munich, Czech Republic/Germany
Eileen S. Kaminsky Family Foundation, Jersey City, New Jersey, USA
 Fait Gallery, Brno, Czech Republic
 Galerie Klatovy/Klenová, Czech Republic
 GAVU, Cheb, Czech Republic
 GHMP, Praha, Czech Republic
Hudson Valley Center for Contemporary Art, Peekskill, New York, USA
Marek Collection, Brno, Czech Republic
 Moravian Gallery, Brno, Czech Republic
National Gallery, Praha, Czech Republic
Olomouc Museum of Art, Czech Republic
 Pudil Family Foundation, Praha, Czech Republic
 Robert Runták Collection, Olomouc, Czech Republic

Bibliography 

 2018 Vaňous, Petr. Inverse Romanticism. Praha: Galerie Rudolfinum
 2017 Brabec, Jaroslav. Orbis Artis: Josef Bolf. 
 2016 Urban, Otto M. Life Is Painful and Breeds Disappointment: Massakr Vol.1 - Lovecraft. Plzeň: Galerie města Plzně
 2015 Vaňous, Petr. Rezonance: Načeradský – Typlt – Bolf. Praha: BIGGBOSS
 2012 Bolf, Josef; Štind Ondřej. Mondschein. Praha: Argo
 2012 Urban, Otto M. A Mirror from the Abyss. Paris: Galerie Dukan Hourdequin
 2010 Barényi, Peter. Video report about the exhibition Unheimliche. Bratislava: Artyčok.tv
2010 Vaňous, Petr. Ještě místo - pustá zem. Plzeň: Západočeská galerie
 2009 Pospiszyl, Tomáš. Josef Bolf. Praha: Divus
 2009 Vidlička, Jan. Interview about exhibition You Are Not You, You Are Me. Praha: Artyčok.tv
 2007 Jeřábková, Edith; Vítková, Lenka. Lovci Lebek. Klatovy: Galerie U Bílého jednorožce

See also
List of Czech painters

References

External links 

 https://josefbolf.net
Artlist – Josef Bolf
 Information system abART  – Bolf Josef

21st-century Czech painters
21st-century male artists
Czech male painters
1971 births
Living people
Artists from Prague